This article lists the official squads for the 1999 Rugby World Cup in Wales.

Pool A

Scotland
Head coach:  Jim Telfer

South Africa
Head coach:  Nick Mallett

Spain
Head coach:  Alfonso Feijoo

Uruguay
Head coach:  Daniel Herrera

Pool B

England
Head coach:  Clive Woodward

Leon Lloyd and Martyn Wood were called up on 23 September as injury replacements for Kyran Bracken and David Rees.

Italy
Head coach:  Massimo Mascioletti

New Zealand
Head coach:  John Hart

Tonga
Head coach:  Polutele Tuʻihalamaka

Pool C

Fiji
Head coach:  Brad Johnstone

Namibia
Head coach:  Rudy Joubert

France
Head coach:  Jean-Claude Skrela

1 Fabien Galthié was called up to the squad to replace Pierre Mignoni after suffering an injury mid-tournament.

Canada
Head Coach:  /  Patrick Parfrey

Pool D

Wales
Head coach:  Graham Henry

Argentina
Head coaches:  Alex Wyllie and  Héctor Mendéz

Samoa
Head coach:  Bryan Williams

On 30 June 1999, Fosi Pala'amo was replaced by Robbie Ale due to knee medial ligament injury before the World Cup.

Japan
Head coach:  Seiji Hirao

Pool E

Ireland 
Head coach:  Warren Gatland

Gordon D'Arcy replaced the injured Girvan Dempsey on 11 September 1999.

United States
Head coach:  Jack Clark

Australia
Head coach:  Rod MacQueen

Romania
Head coach:  Mircea Paraschiv

References

External links
Rugby World Cup – 1999 Tournament International Rugby Board
1999 Rugby World Cup  SA Web
Rugby World Cup Rosters CNN/Sports Illustrated

Squads
1999